He-He Er Xian, translated as the Immortals of Harmony and Union and as the Two gods of Harmony and Union, are two Taoist immortals. They are popularly associated with happy marriages. He and He are typically depicted as boys holding a lotus flower (hé) and a box (hé).

Legend
There are a number of legendary tales behind two celestial beings of He and Ho, among them there is one regarding the two monks living a secluded life in Tiantai Mountain in the Tang Dynasty by the name of Hanshan and Shide and no one know about their subsequent whereabouts. The story is based on Poems of Hanshan and Shide composed by Lv Qiuyin. They were officially canonized as the God of Harmony and the God of Good Union in the first year of Yongzheng rule in the Qing Dynasty. They are widely regarded as gods who bless love between husband and wife.

See also 

 Door gods
 Hanshan the Poet and Shide the Monk, 9th c. prototypes of the two characters.

References

Chinese gods
Taoist immortals

ja:寒山寺#寒山拾得